The 2020–21 Appalachian State Mountaineers women's basketball team represented Appalachian State University during the 2020–21 NCAA Division I women's basketball season. The basketball team, led by second-year head coach Dustin Kerns, played all home games at the Holmes Center along with the Appalachian State Mountaineers men's basketball team. They were members of the Sun Belt Conference.

Previous season 
The Mountaineers finished the 2019–20 season 11–19, 8–10 in Sun Belt play to finish eighth place in the conference. They made it to the 2019-20 Sun Belt Conference women's basketball tournament where they were defeated by Little Rock in the First Round. Shortly after their elimination, the remainder of the tournament as well as all postseason play was cancelled due to the COVID-19 pandemic.

Offseason

Departures

Recruiting

Roster

Schedule and results

|-
!colspan=9 style=| Non-conference Regular Season
|-

|-
!colspan=9 style=| Conference Regular Season
|-

|-
!colspan=9 style=| Sun Belt Tournament

See also
 2020–21 Appalachian State Mountaineers men's basketball team

References

Appalachian State Mountaineers women's basketball seasons
Appalachian State Mountaineers
Appalachian State Mountaineers women's basketball
Appalachian State Mountaineers women's basketball